Einar Sommerfeldt (16 July 1889 – 29 April 1976) was a Norwegian rower. He was born in Kristiania, and competed for Christiania Roklub. He competed in coxed eights  at the 1912 Summer Olympics in Stockholm.

References

External links

1889 births
1976 deaths
Rowers from Oslo
Norwegian male rowers
Rowers at the 1912 Summer Olympics
Olympic rowers of Norway